The 2014–15 Kazakhstan Hockey Championship was the 23rd season since the founding of the Kazakhstan Hockey Championship.

Teams

Regular season

Standings

Play-off

Quarterfinals

Arlan Kokshetau vs. HC Astana

Gornyak Rudny vs. Nomad Astana

Yertis Pavlodar vs. Arystan Temirtau

Beibarys Atyrau vs. HC Almaty

Semi-finals

Arlan Kokshetau vs. Beibarys Atyrau

Gornyak Rudny vs. Yertis Pavlodar

Bronze medal match

Gornyak Rudny vs. Beibarys Atyrau

Final

Arlan Kokshetau vs. Yertis Pavlodar

External links
 

Kazakhstan Hockey Championship
Kazakhstan Hockey Championship seasons
1